Ben Nnebedum Nwankwo (MHR) (born 27 September 1965) is a Nigerian politician and a public administrator. A former three-time Member of the Nigerian House of Representatives in the Nigerian National Assembly., He is presently the chairman of the African Institute of Public Administration (AIPA) headquartered in Accra Ghana. He is also the founder of Leading Edge Group. Dean, London Bridge Business School UK.

Federal House Of Representative(Orumba North and South)

In-Office

2003-2007

Preceded by:

Succeed by: Hon. Kene Offomah

Federal House Of Representative(Orumba North and South)

In-Office

20011-2015

2015-2019

Preceded by: Hon.Kene Offomah

Succeeded by: Hon. Okwudili Ezenwankwo

Personal Details

Born. -   Sep 27 1965 ( age 57)

Nationality -  Anambra, Nigeria.

Spouse -  Mrs. Chineze Ben-Nwankwo

Children -  6

Parents -  Late Chief & Mrs N.N.A Nwankwo

Education -  Community School Akpu

             St. Michael College Nimo

             Federal Polytechnic Oko

             University of Nigeria Nsukka

Profession -  Public Administrator

Awards -  Member of the Order of the Federal Republic (MFR)

Title -  Isingidi Akpu, Ochinanwata, Ugogbuzue omogho etc

Education

  Ben Nwankwo had his Primary Education at the Community School Akpu from 1972 - 1977. He proceeded to St Michael College, Nimo in 1977 and obtained his SSCE in 1982. Got admitted into the Federal Polytechnic Oko, Anambra State where he acquired his OND and HND in 1985 and 1988 respectively in Mass Communication. Got his Post Graduate Diploma from the Uthe University of Nigeria Nsukka in 2004  Ben holds a Master's degree from the University of Nigeria, Nsukka in Pub. Admin & Local Govt. where he emerged as the best student. Doctoral degree in Public Administration and Local Government from the same University in 2018.

Career

   Ben Nwankwo served as a political correspondent to the Guardian Newspaper, Lagos as a corp member. A former managing consultant with the Leading Edge Academy (one of the foremost and fastest growing multidisciplinary in human capital development system, leadership education and public policy centre). Also worked as a Principal Consultant in Bentex Communications Ltd. Lagos.

Politics.

    Ben Nwankwo got his first political appointment as a Personal Assistant to the then governor of Anambra State, Chukwuemeka Ezeife in 1991. Ben Nwankwo was enlisted by fmr Gov. Mbadinuju to serve as his Special Advisor in 1999-2000. He served also as the commissioner for works and transport(2001-2002), Commissioner for Finance& budget(2002-2003) and Commissioner for housing and urban development(2002-2003). In 2003 Ben Nwankwo contested to be a Member of the House of Representatives representing Orumba North/South which he won in a landslide style. Also in 2011 and 2019, he was the member representing orumba north/south in the house of representatives. During his tenure as a house member, he chaired, co-chaired and served as a member of several committees such as deputy chairman House Committee On Co-operation And Integration in Africa. Chairman House Committee on Culture and Tourism, Vice President All Africa Legislative Summit And Chairman Technical Committee on Program Management. Chairman House Committee On Post Privatisation Review, Member Committee on ethics and privileges etc

Professional Association

Ben Nwankwo belongs to many professional bodies with several professional certifications.

He is currently chairing the Governing Council of Africa Institute Of Public Administration(AIPA) Accra Ghana.

Fellow International Chartered Management Consultant

Fellow charted Institute of Public Administration

Certified Management Consultant

Member, Canadian Society for training and development etc.

References

External links
 Member profile: Who's Who Nigeria

1965 births
Living people
Peoples Democratic Party members of the House of Representatives (Nigeria)